The women's tandem sprint B at the 2022 Commonwealth Games is part of the cycling programme, and took place on 29 July 2022. 

No bronze medal was awarded as the minimum five entries did not compete, after a late withdrawal from the fifth entered team. This meant only the gold and silver were awarded per Commonwealth Games Federation regulations.

Records
Prior to this competition, the existing world and Games records were as follows:

Schedule
The schedule is as follows:

All times are British Summer Time (UTC+1)

Results

Qualifying
Times in the qualifying rides determined seeding for the semifinals.

Semifinals
The winners race for the gold and silver medals. The losers race for third place.

Finals
The final classification is determined in the medal finals.

References

 

Cycling at the Commonwealth Games – Women's tandem sprint B
Women's tandem sprint B